{{DISPLAYTITLE:C7H7N5O2}}
The molecular formula C7H7N5O2 (molar mass: 193.16 g/mol, exact mass: 193.0600 u) may refer to:

 6-Methylisoxanthopterin (6MI)
 Toxoflavin

Molecular formulas